Festinger is a surname. Notable people with the surname include:

 Richard Festinger (born 1948), American composer
 Leon Festinger (1919–1989), American social psychologist, responsible for the development of the theory of cognitive dissonance

German-language surnames
German toponymic surnames
Jewish surnames